José Alfredo Jiménez Sandoval (19 January 1926 – 23 November 1973) was a Mexican singer-songwriter of rancheras, whose songs are considered the basis of modern Mexican music.

Biography
Jiménez was born in Dolores Hidalgo, Guanajuato, Mexico. He was discovered in 1948 by the singer Miguel Aceves Mejía and according to him he did not play an instrument and did not even know the Spanish word for "waltz" or what keys his songs were in.

One day in 1948, Miguel Aceves Mejía and some friends arrived for dinner to a restaurant called La Sirena, in Santa Maria de la Rivera. The clerk came to him and asked: “Don Miguel. I'm a waiter because of necessity, but I compose songs. Would you like to hear some? Maybe you like them”. The waiter was José Alfredo Jiménez.

Miguel asked him to look for him at the Radio Station XEW, where he had an audition called Amanecer Ranchero together with the Mariachi Vargas and Rubén Fuentes. A few days later, José Alfredo arrived to the radio and started singing a capella his songs “Ella” and some more. Don Miguel was impressed and promised to support him and record his songs. He recorded "Ella, "Yo", "Serenata huasteca" and "Tu Recuerdo y yo". The first ever songs of José Alfredo Jiménez to be recorded.

After this promising beginning, he composed more than 1,000 songs.  Among the most famous are "Yo", "Me equivoqué contigo", "Ella", "Paloma querida","Que se me acabe la Vida ", "Tú y la mentira", "Media vuelta", "El Rey", "Sin sangre en las venas", "El jinete", "Si nos dejan", "Amanecí en tus brazos", "Llegando a ti", "Tu recuerdo y yo", El hijo del pueblo", "Cuando el destino", "El caballo blanco", "Llegó borracho el Borracho" and "Que te vaya bonito", as well as "Camino de Guanajuato", where he sang about his home state of Guanajuato.

In addition to his own recordings, many of his songs have been recorded by renowned artists from around the Spanish-speaking world, most notably by the following artists:  Selena, which she sang "Cuando Nadie Te Quiera", Miguel Aceves Mejía, Enrique Bunbury, Antonio Aguilar, Tania Libertad, Luis Aguilar, Lola Beltrán, Vikki Carr, Gualberto Castro, Rocío Dúrcal, Alejandro Fernández, Pedro Fernández, Vicente Fernández, Los Relámpagos del Norte con Cornelio Reyna y Ramón Ayala, Los Tigres del Norte, Manolo García, Little Joe Hernández & The Latinaires, Julio Iglesias, Pedro Infante, the Mexican rock group Maná, Luis Miguel, Jorge Negrete, Sunny Ozuna & The Sunliners, María Dolores Pradera, Javier Solís, and Chavela Vargas. In addition, Joaquín Sabina paid homage to Jiménez with his song, "Por el Bulevar de los Sueños Rotos" ("On the Boulevard of Broken Dreams").  The country artist Luke Tan recorded a disc of his favorite Jiménez songs in Spanish, including some English translations.

Like many of his contemporary stars, such as Jorge Negrete, Pedro Infante, and Javier Solís, Jiménez died young. He was only forty-seven years old when he died in Mexico City, of complications resulting from cirrhosis of the liver.

One of his last appearances on Mexican television occurred in 1973, just months prior to his death, where he introduced his last song, "Gracias", accompanied by his wife, singer Alicia Juarez. It was his way of thanking the public for all of the affection they had shown him throughout his career as one of the most prolific and highly regarded composers and singers Mexico has ever produced.

Tribute

Jiménez is buried in his hometown of Dolores Hidalgo, Guanajuato. His tomb, the "Mausoleum of José Alfredo Jiménez", is in the shape of a traditional shawl and sombrero, much like the ones Jiménez would wear during his performances.

Studio albums
 La Sota De Copas (1970)
 El Cantinero (1971)
 El Rey (1971)
 Gracias (1972)
 15 Exitos Inolvidables De (1983) — RCA Records
 12 Exitos De Oro (1988) — RCA Records
 Lo Esencial (2008) — RCA/Lecacy Recordings

Partial filmography

Los huéspedes de La Marquesa (1951)
Here Comes Martin Corona (1952)
El enamorado (1952)
Ni pobres ni ricos (1953)
Los aventureros (1954)
Tres bribones (1955) – Cantante
Camino de Guanajuato (1955) – José Alfredo Martínez
Pura Vida (1956) – El mismo
La fiera (1956) – Cantante
La feria de San Marcos (1958)
Guitarras de medianoche (1958) – José Alfredo
Ferias de México (1959)
Mis padres se divorcian (1959) – Cantante (uncredited)
Cada quién su música (1959)
El hombre del alazán (1959)
Juana Gallo (1961) – Nabor, el caporal
Las hijas del Amapolo (1962)
La Sonrisa de los Pobres (1964)
Escuela para solteras (1965) – El desesperado
Audaz y bravero (1965) – Cantante
Me cansé de rogarle (1966)
Arrullo de Dios (1967)
El caudillo (1968) – Borrego
La chamuscada (1971) – Revolucionario
La loca de los milagros (1975) – (final film role)

References

Cited

Other
 Jiménez, José Alfredo. 1 de Abril del 2002. Publication Somos, Group Televisa S.A de C.V. "Promotor con buen Estrella". Pages 62–63

External links
 El Musico Project: Songs of José Alfredo Jiménez
 Testimony from Miguel Aceves Mejía
 

1926 births
1973 deaths
Singers from Guanajuato
Writers from Guanajuato
People from Dolores Hidalgo
Mexican songwriters
Male songwriters
Mariachi musicians
Deaths from hepatitis
Latin music songwriters
Deaths from cirrhosis
20th-century Mexican male singers